Charlton County High School is a public high school located in Folkston, Georgia, United States. The school is part of the Charlton County School District, which serves Charlton County.

Athletics
Charlton County has won four state championships in football (1999, 2004, 2005, and 2006).

It won its first state championship in Class A Baseball in 2013, and won a second in 2014.

Charlton County won three state championships in track, in 1995, 2005, and 2006.

Notable alumni

 Boss Bailey, former NFL linebacker
 Champ Bailey, former NFL cornerback
 Christopher Milton, NFL cornerback for the Indianapolis Colts  
 David Pender, former NFL cornerback
 Courtney Williams, WNBA point guard for the Connecticut Sun

References

External links

 
 Charlton County School District

Schools in Charlton County, Georgia
Public high schools in Georgia (U.S. state)